The 2020 Folds of Honor QuikTrip 500 was a NASCAR Cup Series race that was originally scheduled to be held on March 15, 2020 and was rescheduled to June 7, 2020, at Atlanta Motor Speedway in Hampton, Georgia. On March 13, 2020, NASCAR announced that they would postpone the race due to the COVID-19 pandemic. Contested over 325 laps on the 1.54-mile-long (2.48 km) asphalt quad-oval intermediate speedway, it was the 10th race of the 2020 NASCAR Cup Series season.

Report

Background

Atlanta Motor Speedway (formerly Atlanta International Raceway) is a track in Hampton, Georgia, 20 miles (32 km) south of Atlanta. It is a  quad-oval track with a seating capacity of 111,000. It opened in 1960 as a  standard oval. In 1994, 46 condominiums were built over the northeastern side of the track. In 1997, to standardize the track with Speedway Motorsports' other two  ovals, the entire track was almost completely rebuilt. The frontstretch and backstretch were swapped, and the configuration of the track was changed from oval to quad-oval. The project made the track one of the fastest on the NASCAR circuit.

The event was run with grandstands, infield, and backstretch camping closed.  Owners of the 46 condominiums in Turn Four were permitted to attend the weekend live with a procedure similar to Charlotte Motor Speedway, with each owner having five tickets to the event, for 230 spectators.

Entry list
 (R) denotes rookie driver.
 (i) denotes driver who are ineligible for series driver points.

Qualifying
Chase Elliott was awarded the pole for the race as determined by a random draw.

Starting Lineup

Race

Stage Results

Stage One
Laps: 105

Stage Two
Laps: 105

Final Stage Results

Stage Three
Laps: 115

Race statistics
 Lead changes: 21 among 9 different drivers
 Cautions/Laps: 5 for 24
 Red flags: 0
 Time of race: 3 hours, 30 minutes and 3 seconds
 Average speed:

Media

Television
The Folds of Honor QuikTrip 500 was carried by Fox in the United States. Mike Joy and five-time Atlanta winner Jeff Gordon covered the race from the Fox Sports studio in Charlotte. Jamie Little handled the pit road duties. Larry McReynolds provided insight from the Fox Sports studio in Charlotte.

Radio
The race was broadcast on radio by the Performance Racing Network and simulcast on Sirius XM NASCAR Radio. Doug Rice and Mark Garrow called the race from the booth when the field raced down the front stretch. Rob Albright called the race from atop a billboard outside of turn 2 when the field raced through turns 1 and 2 & Pat Patterson called the race from a billboard outside of turn 3 when the field raced through turns 3 and 4. On pit road, PRN was manned by Brad Gillie, Brett McMillan and Doug Turnbull.

Standings after the race

Drivers' Championship standings

Manufacturers' Championship standings

Note: Only the first 16 positions are included for the driver standings.
. – Driver has clinched a position in the NASCAR Cup Series playoffs.

References

2020 in sports in Georgia (U.S. state)
2020 NASCAR Cup Series
Folds of Honor QuikTrip 500
NASCAR races at Atlanta Motor Speedway